Ahren Spylo (né Nittel; born December 6, 1983) is a Canadian former professional ice hockey player who last played for HC Davos in the National League.

Playing career
Born in Waterloo, Ontario to a German mother and Canadian father, Nittel (at the time) played junior hockey for the Windsor Spitfires of the Ontario Hockey League. His play attracted the attention of the New Jersey Devils of the NHL, who drafted him in the third round, 85th overall in the 2002 NHL Entry Draft. In his final junior season of 2002-03, he was traded to the Oshawa Generals of the OHL.

After spending most of three pro seasons with the Albany River Rats of the American Hockey League, he began playing in Europe and adopted his father's  name "Spylo." Since 2006, he has played for several teams in the Nationalliga A in Switzerland, Deutsche Eishockey Liga in Germany, and the Kontinental Hockey League in Russia.

As a member of the Nürnberg Ice Tigers, he was named the Hockey News player of the month in September, 2007. He was also selected to the 2008 DEL All-Star Game.

In his third season with EHC Biel, Spylo was selected to participate in the Spengler Cup, representing Canada.

Career statistics

References

External links
 

1983 births
Canadian people of German descent
HC Vityaz players
Ice hockey people from Ontario
Living people
New Jersey Devils draft picks
Oshawa Generals players
Sportspeople from Waterloo, Ontario
Windsor Spitfires players
Canadian expatriate ice hockey players in Russia
Canadian ice hockey left wingers